KGWA (960 AM) is a radio station broadcasting a News Talk Information format. Licensed to Enid, Oklahoma, United States, the station serves the Oklahoma City area. The station is currently owned by Williams Broadcasting LLC and features programming from Fox News Radio, Genesis Communications Network, Premiere Networks, Salem Radio Network, USA Radio Network, and Westwood One.

Translator

References

External links
https://www.kgwanews.com

News and talk radio stations in the United States
GWA